Labdia eumelaena is a moth in the family Cosmopterigidae. It was described by Edward Meyrick in 1897. It is found in Australia, where it has been recorded from South Australia.

References

Labdia
Moths described in 1897